Mona Ofeich (born c.1943) is a Lebanese lawyer who served as minister of state without portfolio, appointed to her post in November 2009 as part of the cabinet appointed by president Michel Sleiman.

Ofeich was 67 years old on her appointment. Politically unaffiliated, she is of Greek Orthodox background. She became, with finance minister Raya Haffar Al Hassan, one of only two women in the Lebanese cabinet.

References

1943 births
Living people
Greek Orthodox Christians from Lebanon
Eastern Orthodox Christians from Lebanon
Members of the Parliament of Lebanon
Government ministers of Lebanon
Women government ministers of Lebanon
21st-century Lebanese women politicians
21st-century Lebanese politicians